This is the complete list of (physical and digital) number-one albums sold in Finland in 2013 according to the Official Finnish Charts compiled by Musiikkituottajat – IFPI Finland.

Chart history

See also
List of number-one singles of 2013 (Finland)

References

Number-one albums
Finland Albums
2013